Eyes of Dawn is a South Korean television series starring Choi Jae-sung, Chae Shi-ra and Park Sang-won. Directed by Kim Jong-hak and written by Song Ji-na based on the 10-volume novel of the same name by Kim Seong-jong (published in 1981), the story spans the years from the Japanese colonial period to World War II, Korea's liberation and the Korean War.

It aired on MBC from October 7, 1991, to February 6, 1992, for 36 episodes, and reached a peak viewership rating of 58.4%, making it the 9th highest-rated Korean drama of all time. In 1992, MBC sold Eyes of Dawn to the Turkish Radio and Television Corporation, becoming the first Korean drama exported to a European country.

Cast

Choi Jae-sung as Choi Dae-chi
Chae Shi-ra as Yoon Yeo-ok
Park Sang-won as Jang Ha-rim
Choi Bool-am as Yoon Hong-chul, Yeo-ok's father
Park Geun-hyung as Choi Du-il (Suzuki)
Lee Jung-gil as Kim Ki-mun
Jang Hang-sun as OOE Oh Jang
Park In-hwan as Private Gu Bo-da
Im Hyun-sik as Hwang Sung-chul
Kim Heung-ki as Daewi Mida Yoshinori
Han Cha-dol as Choi Dae-woon, Dae-chi and Yeo-ok's son
Oh Yeon-soo as Bong-soon
Go Hyun-jung as Ahn Myeong-ji
Choi Hyun-mi as Lee Kyeong-ae
Shim Yang-hong as Lawyer Park Chang-seok
Nam Sung-hoon as Baek In-soo
Lee Chang-hwan as President Syngman Rhee
Min Ji-hwan as Unit 731 director Shirō Ishii
Kim Ki-joo as 15th Army commander Renya Mutaguchi
Kim Du-sam as "Maruta" military police
Kim Dong-hyun as Jang Kyung-rim, Ha-rim's older brother
Kim So-won as Ha-rim and Kyung-rim's mother
Ahn Hye-sook as Kyung-rim's wife
Cheon Woon as General Hwang
Kim In-moon as Lee Min-seob
Gook Jeong-hwan as Kim Deok-jae
Shin Dong-hoon as Leader
Park Yong-soo as Lee Joo-hwan
Byun Hee-bong as Park Chun-geum
Hong Sung-min as Kwak Chun-bu
Lee Won-jae as Jo Gwi-mun
Kim Young-ok  as Elder Kim
Kim Ji-young as Miss Ahn
Choi Sang-hoon as General Kim
Chung Jin as Go Chang-dae
Nam Po-dong as Bu Tae-jong
Yoo Seung-bong as Kim Jeong-sik
Lee Dae-ro as Ahn Jae-hong
Choi Myung-soo as Jo Byung-ok
Park Woong as Noh Il-young
Lee Hyo-jung as Kim Ik-ryul
Choi Byung-hak as Chief of police Moon
Park Young-ji as Detective Oh
Kim Young-seok as Constable Song
Park Se-joon as Lieutenant Moon
Jung Dong-hwan as Prosecutor Kim Seung-won
Jung Han-heon as Nishihara
Kim Hong-seok as Oowaku 
Im Dae-ho as Kenji
Yoon Cheol-hyeong as Unit 731 lieutenant Tamura
Lee Hee-do as Unit 731 private Ohara
Hong Soon-chang as Unit 731 동물반 Isaki
Yoon Moon-sik as Go-ga
Jung Sung-mo as Lee Sung-do
Jung Ho-keun as Kwon Dong-jin
Jung Myung-hwan as Kang Gyun
Song Kyung-chul as OSS agent Park Il-guk
Kim Joo-young as Seo Kang-cheon
Kim Hyun-joo as Ga Jeuk-ko, Ha-rim's lover and boarding house owner
Jeon Mi-seon as Oh Soon-ae
Lee Young-dal as Soon-ae's grandfather
Kim Na-woon as Mae-ran
Kwak Jin-young as Im Gap-saeng
Jung Ok-seon as Mr. Go's wife
Lee Sung-woong as Japanese 고등계 detective Yamada
Maeng Sang-hoon as Konno
Lee Mi-kyung as Hanako
Kwon Eun-ah as Min-hee
Kim Gil-ho as Ga Jeuk-ko's father
Nam Young-jin as Kwon Joong-gu
Hwang Beom-sik as Choi Sung-geun
Im Moon-soo as Communist Party official
Kim Ki-hyun as Kim Ki-mun
Noh Young-guk as Kim Ho
Han Suk-kyu as Young man from Seobuk
Im Chang-jung as Gil-soo
Na Young-jin as People's Commissar
Hong Seong-seon as Young man with armband
Seo Young-ae as Sang-beom's woman
Moon Mi-bong as Old woman Kim
Dennis Christen as 아얄티 lieutenant colonel
Han Eun-jin as Old woman Geum
Kim Yoon-hyeong as General Kim
Park Young-tae as Han Kyu-hee
Kim Dong-wan as Unit 731 surgeon
Han Tae-il as Unit 731 daewi
Yoo Toong as Unit 58 headquarters staff member
Lee Chi-woo as Sergeant
Cha Jae-hong as Detective Kang
Ahn Jin-soo as Choi Cheon
Kim Myung-soo as Jong-hoon
Park Kyung-hyun as Interrogator Uhm
Lee Kwang-hoon as OSS officer
Hong Seung-ok as Sung-chul's wife
Yoo Myung-soon as Il-gook's mother
Park Jong-seol as Japanese military police 빨치산 
Oh Seung-myung as Commissary director
Hwang Yoon-geol as Communist Party member
Lee Byung-sik as Communist Party interrogator 1
Kim Dong-hyun as Communist Party interrogator 2
Shim Woo-chang as Communist Party member
Lee Seong-ho as Communist Party member
Cha Yoon-hee as Man on Jeju Island
Park Hyeong-joon as Young man at anti-privatization protest
Gu Bo-seok as Partisan worker

Awards
1991 MBC Drama Awards
Top Excellence Award, Actor: Choi Jae-sung
Top Excellence Award, Actress: Chae Shi-ra

1992 Baeksang Arts Awards
Technical Award: Jo Su-hyeon
Most Popular Actor (TV): Park Sang-won
Best Actor (TV): Choi Jae-sung
Best Actress (TV): Chae Shi-ra
Best Director (TV): Kim Jong-hak
Best Drama 
Grand Prize (Daesang) for TV

1992 Korean Broadcasting Awards
Best Drama

References

External links
Eyes of Dawn at MBC

1990s South Korean television series
MBC TV television dramas
Television series set in Korea under Japanese rule
1991 South Korean television series debuts
1992 South Korean television series endings
South Korean action television series
Television shows based on South Korean novels
South Korean historical television series
Television shows written by Song Ji-na